A Climate for Killing (also known as A Row of Crows) is a 1991 American thriller-drama film  written and directed by J. S. Cardone and starring John Beck, Katharine Ross, Steven Bauer and Mia Sara.

Plot 
Before a rodeo in Yuma, a woman's body is found, presumed murdered by her wealthy husband sixteen years earlier, but the body's much fresher than that.

Cast 
  John Beck as Kyle Shipp
  Katharine Ross as Grace Hines
  Steven Bauer as Paul McGraw
  Mia Sara as Elise Shipp
 Phil Brock  as Click Dunn
  Lu Leonard as Winnie
  Tony Frank as Sheriff Elmer Waters
  John Diehl as Wayne Paris
  Newell Alexander as Roy Paris
  Sherrie Rose as Rita Paris
  Dedee Pfeiffer as Donna
  Eloy Casados as Ruiz Sanchez
  Jack Dodson as Sam Moorehouse
  Cheryl Waters as Birdy

References

External links
 

1990s thriller drama films
American thriller drama films
Films directed by J. S. Cardone
Films scored by Robert Folk
1990s English-language films